A cyclic enzyme system is a theoretical system of two enzymes sharing a single substrate or cofactor, also referred to as a biochemical switching device. It has been used as a biochemical implementation of a simple computational device, acting as a chemical diode.

See also
 Biocomputer
 Computational gene

References

Enzymes